The Communipaw Ferry was a major ferry service that operated between the village of Communipaw (in what would become Jersey City, New Jersey) and Lower Manhattan, New York. The ferry began operations in 1661 after the Colonial Dutch administrators of New Amsterdam granted a charter to operate the ferry. soon after the establishment of Bergen atop Bergen Hill. It was the first reported ferry service established across the Hudson River and it remained active up until 1783 when New York City was captured by the British. 

Communipaw Ferry also refers to Central Railroad of New Jersey service between Communipaw Terminal in Jersey City and Liberty Street Ferry Terminal in Manhattan.

See also
Jersey City Ferry
List of ferries across the Hudson River to New York City
List of fixed crossings of the Hudson River
North River
Port of New York and New Jersey
Timeline of Jersey City area railroads

References

Ferries of New Jersey
Ferries of New York City
Ferry companies of New Jersey
Ferry companies of New York City
Water transportation in New York City
Transportation in Jersey City, New Jersey
New Netherland